The Bond of Saint Marcel is a six-issue comic book limited series published by American company Archaia Studios Press. It was created and written by Jennifer Quintenz, with pencils by  Christian Gossett.

Plot 

For centuries, a mysterious order of priests has jealously guarded the secret of the Bond of Saint Marcel: an occult ritual that enabled priests of the Order to enslave vampires and use them as unwilling soldiers against their own kind.  When 16-year-old Katherine Johnstone inherits an ancient family signet ring she is swept into a world of fatal secrets and a centuries-old quest for vengeance.  But with the ring, Kat has also inherited the power to command a vampire, and he may be her only hope of survival.

Characters
Eamann Innis: a powerful vampire bonded to the Johnstone family during the American Revolution, Eamann has been a slave of the family for over 200 years.  He bears no love for the Johnstones.
Katherine (Kat) Johnstone: the youngest descendant of Avrey Johnstone, the American Revolution Colonel who originally bonded Eamann into service.  The black-sheep of her family, Kat is struggling to find her place in the world.
Adrian: a mysterious vampire who's targeted the Johnstone family with the aim of eliminating every last one of them.
Lilah: Adrian's devilish lover.
Simon: Adrian's brutal right-hand man.
Father Collin & Father Jerome: two members of the current day Order of Saint Marcel.

External links
Archaia Studios Press' The Bond Of Saint Marcel Page

Review of The Bond of Saint Marcel #1, Comics Bulletin, July 3, 2008